Hermann Jónasson (25 December 1896 – 22 January 1976) was an Icelandic politician of the Progressive Party, who was prime minister of Iceland on two occasions.

He served his first term from 28 July 1934 to 16 May 1942. This term included one of the most difficult times in Icelandic history. In the pre-war years he had to deal with constant pressures from Nazi Germany and the United Kingdom regarding Iceland's diplomatic stance. After World War II started, the German occupation of Denmark severed the ties between the two countries, forcing Iceland to assume full control over its foreign interests which had previously been represented by Denmark. Subsequently, the British occupied Iceland on 10 May 1940.

His second term lasted from 24 July 1956 to 23 December 1958. In the elections of 1956 the Progressive Party and the Social Democratic Party joined forces and formed an electoral alliance that became known as the "Fear-Alliance" (Icelandic: Hræðslubandalagið, the fear in question being the fear of the Independence Party). After the elections the "Fear-Alliance" formed a coalition with The People's Alliance. This was Iceland's first leftist government, and was plagued with troubles from the outset, not the least of which was the relative hostility and distrust of the United States and other NATO allies. The coalition eventually fell apart, giving way to the long-lasting "Reconstruction Government" of the Independence Party and the Social Democrats.

Hermann had a reputation for being a very strong willed and often hot-tempered man (once slapping a Socialist member of the Althing). He however gained great respect of political co-workers and adversaries alike, and is fondly remembered as one of Iceland's greatest 20th Century politicians.

He was the father of Steingrímur Hermannsson, who would go on to become Prime Minister of Iceland in the 1980s. His grandson, Guðmundur Steingrímsson, was elected to the Althing in 2009.

In 2007 Hermann was the subject of a mild controversy, when DNA-testing proved that he had, during his years as a public official, fathered a child out of wedlock. A lawyer named Lúðvík Gizurarson had for several years claimed to be Hermann's illegitimate son. After several years of legal battles, Lúðvík's case was put to a DNA-test which turned out positive.

|-

|-

1896 births
1976 deaths
Progressive Party (Iceland) politicians
Prime Ministers of Iceland
World War II political leaders